Teston Crossing Halt was situated on what is now the Medway Valley Line, south of Maidstone, in Kent, and served Teston and West Farleigh. It opened on 1 September 1909 and closed on 2 November 1959. The location of the halt was to the south of the level crossing.
 

References

Sources.

 

Borough of Maidstone
Disused railway stations in Kent
Former South Eastern Railway (UK) stations
Railway stations in Great Britain opened in 1909
Railway stations in Great Britain closed in 1959
1909 establishments in England
1959 disestablishments in England